The Queen's Birthday Honours 2013 were announced on 10 June 2013 by the Governor General of Australia, Quentin Bryce.

† indicates an award given posthumously.

Order of Australia

Companion (AC)

General Division

 James Crawford  – of Cambridge – United Kingdom. For eminent service to the law through significant contributions to international and constitutional legal practice, reform and arbitration, and as a leading jurist, academic and author.
 Jill Ker Conway  – of Boston – United States of America. For eminent service to the community, particularly women, as an author, academic and through leadership roles with corporations, foundations, universities and philanthropic groups.

Officer (AO)

General Division
 Professor Christopher James Baggoley  – For distinguished service to medicine, particularly in the area of emergency medicine as a clinician, to medical administration and public health care, and to education.
 The Honourable Justice John Harris Byrne  – For distinguished service to the judiciary and to the law, particularly in Queensland, as a leading contributor to legal education and reform, and to professional development and training.
 Barbara Amy Cail  – For distinguished service to public health through advocacy and advisory roles for people with Alzheimer's disease, to the advancement of social welfare and equity, and to the arts.
 Doctor Kenneth Willis Cato  – For distinguished service to the graphic design profession as a practitioner, and through education and development roles both nationally and internationally.
 Professor Simon Fenton Chapman  – For distinguished service to medical research as an academic and author, particularly in the area of public health policy, and to the community.
 Ronald William Clarke  – For distinguished service to the community through a range of leadership roles with local government and philanthropic organisations, and to the promotion of athletics.
 Robert Dickerson  – For distinguished service to the visual arts as a figurative painter, and to the community through support for a range of cultural, medical research and social welfare organisations.
 Professor Graham Farquhar  – For distinguished service to science in the areas of plant physiology and climate change as a leading researcher, academic and author.
 James Malcolm Freemantle  – For distinguished service to the community of Western Australia as a contributor to social welfare, church and sporting organisations, through senior business and financial roles, and to the arts.
 Jennie George  – For distinguished service to industrial relations, to the Parliament of Australia, and to the community.
 Petro Georgiou  – For distinguished service to the Parliament of Australia, to multiculturalism and human rights advocacy, and to the community.
 Fiona Margaret Hall  – For distinguished service to the visual arts as a painter, sculptor and photographer, and to art education.
 Peter Noel Harris  – For distinguished service to public administration through leadership and policy reform roles in the areas of telecommunications, the environment, primary industry and transport.
 Gabi Hollows  – For distinguished service to public health as an advocate for the eradication of blindness, particularly for Indigenous Australians and people in the developing world.
 Professor Garry Lawrence Jennings  – For distinguished service to medical research, particularly the prevention and control of cardiovascular disease, obesity and diabetes, to professional associations, and to education.
 Doctor Simon Allen Longstaff  – For distinguished service to the community through the promotion of ethical standards in governance and business, to improving corporate responsibility, and to philosophy.
 Associate Professor John Clark McBain  – For distinguished service to reproductive medicine as a gynaecologist, particularly in the area of infertility, to medical education as an academic, and to professional organisations.
 Professor Shirley Elizabeth McKechnie  – For distinguished service to the performing arts, particularly dance, to the education and development of dancers and  Choreographers, and to research.
 Emeritus Professor Thomas Alexander McMeekin  – For distinguished service to science, particularly in the discipline of agricultural microbiology, as an academic and author, and to the development of food safety standards and education.
 Professor Robert John Norman  – For distinguished service to medicine in the field of reproductive health through significant contributions as a researcher and clinician.
 Margaret O'Donnell  – For distinguished service to public administration in Queensland, particularly in the arts sector, to the community through leadership roles in cultural, public health and social welfare organisations, and to legal education.
 June Oscar  – For distinguished service to the Indigenous community of Western Australia, particularly through health and social welfare programs.
 Doctor Michael Pearson  – For distinguished service to cultural heritage conservation and management, through contributions to professional organisations, and as an educator and researcher.
 Heather Ridout  – For distinguished service to business and industry through significant contributions to the development of economic and public policy.
 Emeritus Professor Alan David Robson  – For distinguished service to tertiary education through governance and administrative roles, to the advancement of scientific and medical research, and to the community.
 Mary Cornelia Salce  – For distinguished service to women, particularly in rural communities, through leadership and advocacy roles, and to water conservation and management.
 Gregory John Vickery  – For distinguished service to the international community through leadership and governance of humanitarian aid organisations.
 Barbara Wieland  – For distinguished service to public administration in, and to the community of, South Australia through the delivery and reform of mental health services.

Military Division

Army
 Major General Peter Warwick Gilmore  – For distinguished service as Special Operations Commander Australia, Commander of the International Security Assistance Force Special Operations Forces, and Deputy Special Operations Commander Australia.

Air Force
 Air Vice-Marshal Kevin John Paule  – For distinguished service as the Head of Military Strategic Commitments and Commander Integrated Area Defence System.

Member (AM)

General Division
 Philip Stanley Aiken – For significant service to international relations through the promotion of Australian trade in the United Kingdom.
 Joy Cecile Anderson – For significant service to community health and education, particularly through the Australian Breastfeeding Association.
 Stanley Alexander Archard – For significant service to irrigated agriculture, and to conservation.
 Dr Alan Cameron Archer  – For significant service to agricultural education, and to heritage management and conservation.
 The Honourable Justice David John Ashley – For significant service to the judiciary and the law, and to the beef cattle industry.
 Dr Robert Arthur Barr – For significant service to engineering, particularly electrical energy supply and distribution.
 Dr Elaine Frances Barry – For significant service to the community through social welfare organisations, and to education.
 Michael John Bassingthwaighte – For significant service to the health insurance industry, and to the community of the Illawarra region.
 Dr Paul Ernest Beaumont – For significant service to medicine, particularly in the field of ophthalmology.
 John William Berryman – For significant service to people with a disability, and to the community.
 The Honourable Mrs Rosalind Marianne Blades – For significant service to local government, and to the community of the Greater Dandenong region.
 Les Blakebrough – For significant service to the visual arts as a ceramicist and educator and through professional artistic associations.
 Professor Nikolai Bogduk – For significant service to medical research and education, particularly in the specialties of anatomy, spinal health and chronic pain management.
 Dr Brian David Bowring – For significant service to medicine in rural and regional areas, and as a general practitioner.
Michael Brady – For significant service to the community, and to music as a composer and performer.
 Alexander Norman Brennan – For significant service to business and commerce, to tertiary education administration, and to the community.
 Jacqueline Brown – For significant service to agricultural education in Tasmania.
Elizabeth Blomfield Bryan – For significant service to the financial services and superannuation sectors, and to corporate governance.
 Kristal Irene Buckley – For significant service to conservation and the environment, particularly in the area of cultural heritage, and to education.
 † Mavis Margaret Burgess  –For significant service to the community of King Island through a range of health, social welfare and volunteer organisations.
 Margaret Frances Burns – For significant service to the community, particularly to children recovering from illness and trauma, and to the entertainment industry.
Ronald Leslie Burns – For significant service to the community, particularly to children recovering from illness and trauma, and to the entertainment industry.
 William Calabria – For significant service to the wine industry, and to the community of the Riverina.
 Michael Joseph Callaghan  – For significant service to public administration, particularly in international economic policy development and financial reform.
Kim David Carpenter – For significant service to the performing arts.
 Professor Cordia Mingyeuk Chu – For significant service to reproductive and public health programs.
 Dr Anthony Collins – For significant service to dentistry, and to the community.
William Delafield Cook – For significant service to the visual arts as a realist painter of Australian landscapes.
 Darryl Desmond Courtney-O'Connor – For significant service to the tourism and hospitality sector, and to the development of industry education.
 Anne Gabrielle Crawford – For significant service to the community, particularly through the promotion of health and fitness to raise funds for cancer research.
 Robin Ann Dalton – For significant service to the film industry as a producer, literary agent and author, and as a mentor to emerging actors and writers.
 Maree Lynn Davidson – For significant service to the Indigenous community, and to the welfare of children and multicultural youth.
Ivor Arthur Davies – For significant service to the music and entertainment industry as a songwriter and performer, and to the community.
 Colin William Dillon  – For significant service to the Indigenous community of Queensland.
 Dr Martin Bryn Dooland – For significant service to public dental health.
 Dr Kevin Adrian Doyle – For significant service to veterinary science, and to animal health programs.
 Peter John Duncan – For significant service to public administration in New South Wales, and to conservation and the environment.
Colin Wayne Dunsford – For significant service to the community of South Australia, and to the accounting profession.
 Richard Martin Eckersley – For significant service to the community as a researcher, analyst and commentator on population health and well-being in Australia.
 Dr Patricia Margaret Ellis – For significant service to veterinary science, particularly through the development of quarantine and biosecurity protocols in the equine industry.
 Emeritus Professor Norman Alan Etherington – For significant service to education, particularly in the discipline of history, through contributions to heritage preservation, and to the community.
 Cadel Lee Evans – For significant service to cycling, and to the community.
 Dr Eric Charles Fairbank – For significant service to palliative care medicine in regional Victoria.
 Terence Francis Fitzgerald – For significant service to the development of the credit union movement, and to the community.
 Carolyn Lennox Fletcher – For significant service to the community, particularly through the establishment of education and training opportunities for children in Cambodia.
 David Norman Galbally  – For significant service to the community, particularly through leadership in health organisations and the provision of pro bono legal services.
 Marianne Suleika Gaul – For significant service to nursing, particularly through providing improved emergency health services to rural communities.
 Robert Francis Goode – For significant service to the performing arts and to the community as an organist, harpsichordist and chamber musician.
 Nance Gwyneth Grant  – For significant service to the performing arts, particularly opera.
 Ronald Norman Haddrick  – For significant service to the performing arts as an actor and narrator.
 Dr John Meredith Harrison – For significant service to orthopaedic medicine, and to water polo.
Nanette Louise Hassall – For significant service to the performing arts, particularly through dance education.
 Susan Hawick – For significant service to education, particularly through the school counselling profession.
 Anthony Robert Hedley – For significant service to business, particularly the property sector, and to the community of Canberra.
 Professor John Raymond Hopkins  – For significant service to the performing arts, particularly as a conductor, to music education, and to the community.
 The Honourable Michael James Horan – For significant service to the Parliament of Queensland, and to the community of the Darling Downs.
 Trevor Colin Horman – For significant service to the Northern Territory, particularly through heritage preservation, the motor racing industry, and the engineering profession.
 Elizabeth Ann Hounslow – For significant service to the community through organisations promoting social justice, Indigenous health and human rights.
 Dr Duncan Standon Ironmonger – For significant service to economics as a researcher, author and academic.
 Leesa Madonna Jeffcoat – For significant service to the Catholic education system in Queensland, and to the community.
 Timothy Kain – For significant service to music as a classical guitarist, educator and mentor.
 Professor Siri Kannangara – For significant service to medicine, particularly in the field of sports medicine and rheumatology.
 † Emeritus Professor Antoni Emil Karbowiak – For significant service to tertiary education in the field of electrical engineering, and to science and technology as a researcher in the field of telecommunications.
 Peter John Knight – For significant service to the community, particularly through support to the homeless, and to engineering.
 Colin Herbert Koch – For significant service to arts administration, particularly the development of Indigenous art and culture.
 Katie Lahey – For significant service to business and commerce, and to the arts.
 Jill Lang – For significant service to the community, and to the not-for-profit sector.
 Dr Hugh John Lavery – For significant service to the environment and conservation.
 John Danvers Leece  – For significant service to the community, particularly to the Scouting movement, and to philanthropy.
 Professor Peter Adrian Leggat – For significant service to medicine as a specialist in the fields of tropical and travel medicine.
 Lyn Lennox – For significant service to occupational therapy, particularly through support to children with developmental and learning difficulties.
 Frances Irma Lindsay – For significant service to the arts, particularly as a curator and administrator in galleries and museums.
 Professor Yew-Chaye Loo – For significant service to civil and structural engineering.
 Robert Martin Lunn  – For significant service to the judiciary of South Australia, particularly as the author of texts relating to civil procedure and criminal law, and to the community.
 Christine Kris Macauley – For significant service to business in the Australian Capital Territory.
 Andrew John Mahar – For significant service to the community and social justice through the provision of access to technology, and to Timor Leste.
 Susan Craig Maple-Brown – For significant service to youth through the Guiding movement, and to the community.
 Michael James Martin – For significant service to the surf lifesaving movement.
 Robert Michael McCarthy – For significant service to public administration in Queensland, particularly in the areas of economic development, agriculture and natural resource management.
 The Honourable James Andrew McGinty – For significant service to the Parliament of Western Australia, to law reform, and to the community.
 Dr Edgeworth David McIntyre – For significant service to orthopaedic medicine as a surgeon and an educator.
 Simone Irene McMahon – For significant service to community health through the promotion and awareness of organ donation and transplantation.
 Suzanne Lydia Medway – For significant service to wildlife conservation.
 The Honourable Dean Mildren  – For significant service to the judiciary and to the law in the Northern Territory.
 Dr Francis Xavier Moloney – For significant service to medicine, particularly in the field of anaesthesia.
 David Ernest Montgomery – For significant service to agriculture, particularly the potato industry.
 Elizabeth Maria Morgan – For significant service to music education, particularly of the violin.
 Peter Gwyn Morgan – For significant service to public sector governance in Tasmania, and to the community.
William Mortimer Muirhead – For significant service to the community of South Australia through the promotion of international trade.
 The Honourable Mr Paul Robert Munro – For significant service to workplace relations, the trade union movement, and to industrial law.
 His Honour Judge Matthew David Myers – For significant service to the community, particularly in the area of family law and welfare.
 Aarne Olavi Neeme – For significant service to the performing arts as a director and educator in theatre and television.
 Winthrop Professor John Phillipps Newnham – For significant service to medicine in the field of obstetrics.
 John Nicolakis – For significant service to the Australian-Greek community of the Northern Territory.
 Richard James Owens  – For significant service to the community, particularly in the Hunter region.
 Stephen Richard Phillips – For significant service to arts administration in the field of opera.
 The Reverend Dr David Arthur Pitman – For significant service to the Uniting Church in Australia, to the promotion of ecumenism, and to education.
 Des Powell – For significant service to business and commerce, and to the community.
 Lewis Pretorius – For significant service to the community of Tasmania, and to Rotary International.
 Graham Henry Price – For significant service to the primary industry sector, particularly through the development of soil testing programs.
 The Most Reverend Michael Ernest Putney – For significant service to the Catholic Church in Australia, to the promotion of inter-faith dialogue, and to the community of Townsville.
 Merlyn Quaife – For significant service to music.
 Councillor Catherine Joan Redwood – For significant service to the community of Victoria.
 Kenneth Reginald Reed – For significant service to the performing and visual arts as a supporter and philanthropist.
 Glenn Eric Rees – For significant service to community health, particularly aged care, Alzheimer's disease and dementia.
 Dr David Charles Rentz – For significant service to science, particularly in the field of entomology, and to the community.
 † David Jerome Roche – For significant service to the community, particularly as a benefactor to cultural institutions.
 Dr John Graham Rogers – For significant service to medicine in the fields of clinical genetics and paediatrics.
 Rowan Alexander Ross – For significant service to arts governance, and to business.
 Katrina Le Breton Rumley – For significant service to the visual arts, particularly in the museums and galleries sector.
 † Graeme Edward Rundle  – For significant service to conservation and the environment in Western Australia.
 Marguerite Anne Ryan – For significant service to the community through the development of assistance programs for women and children in Africa.
 Professor Antonio Giuseppe Sagona – For significant service to tertiary education in the field of archaeology.
 Paul Salteri – For significant service to the building and construction industry, and to philanthropy.
 Robert Philip Sessions – For significant service to the Australian publishing industry.
 Dr David Anthony Sheen – For significant service to dentistry, particularly in developing countries.
 Dr Richard Frederick Sheldrake – For significant service to public administration in New South Wales, and to the community.
Judith Margaret Small – For significant service to folk music, as a songwriter and recording artist.
 Gerard Thomas Stevens – For significant service to the pharmaceutical industry, and to community health.
 Casey Joel Stoner – For significant service to motorcycle racing.
 Doreen Stoves  – For significant service to the community, particularly through social welfare programs.
 Anna Trehearne Sweeny – For significant service to opera as a teacher of movement and stagecraft.
 Howard Napier Tanner – For significant service to architecture, and to heritage conservation.
 Robert Waddell Taylor – For significant service to youth through the Scouting movement, and to the community.
 Ross Taylor – For significant service to Australia-Indonesia relations, to primary industry and transport, and to the community.
 Professor Philip Douglas Thompson  – For significant service to neurology, particularly in the field of Parkinson's disease and movement disorders.
 Adjunct Professor Ralph Tobias – For significant service to the development and commercialisation of technological innovations.
 Constantine Dionysios Vertzayias – For significant service to the Australian-Greek community.
 Professor Euan Morrison Wallace – For significant service to medicine, particularly in the areas of obstetrics and gynaecology.
 Professor Robyn Lynne Ward – For significant service to medical research and patient care in the field of oncology.
 Dr Lynn Maria Weekes – For significant service to community health through the promotion of quality use of medicines.
 Dr Peter Harold Woodruff – For significant service to medicine, particularly in the field of vascular surgery and through contributions to healthcare standards.
 Dr Jennifer Margaret Wray – For significant service to medicine in rural areas, particularly in the community of Narooma.
 Michael Edward Wright – For significant service to business in Western Australia.

Military Division

Navy
 Captain Michael Kent Smith  – For exceptional performance of duty in the field of Navy workforce design and management.
 Commander Evan Paul Davies  – For exceptional service as a Joint Operational Planner at Headquarters Joint Operations Command in support of operations in Afghanistan from January 2007 to December 2012.

Army
 Brigadier William Timothy Sowry  – For exceptional service as Director General Estate Companion Review and Deputy Head Cadet Reserve and Employer Support Division.
 Colonel Andrew Douglas Gallaway  – For exceptional service as Commanding Officer of the 1st Battalion, the Royal Australian Regiment, Commanding Officer Joint Task Force 635, Directing Staff at the Australian Command and Staff College and the Director of Soldier Career Management – Army. 
 Colonel Brendan Peter Stevens  – For exceptional service to the Australian Defence Force in the fields of career management and workforce strategy.
 Colonel Michael George Tucker  – For exceptional service to the Australian Army as Director of Military Commitments – Army and Director of Studies – Land, Australian Command and Staff College.
 Lieutenant Colonel Darleen Maree Young  – For exceptional service to the Australian Defence Force in the field of education and training.

Air Force
 Group Captain Michael William Brown  – For exceptional performance of duty as Officer Commanding Air Lift Systems Program Office and as Project Director Intelligence, Surveillance and Reconnaissance.
 Wing Commander Mark Louis Masini  – For exceptional service to the Australian Defence Force in the field of technical airworthiness standards and regulation.

Medal (OAM)

General Division

Military Division

Navy
 Commander Brian Oswald Nitschinsk  – For meritorious service in the field of engineering in the Royal Australian Navy.
 Warrant Officer Frederick Lindsay Campbell  – For meritorious service in the field of aviation maintenance and for leadership as a Warrant Officer in HMA Ships Cerberus and Creswell.
 Warrant Officer Michael David CONNORS  – For meritorious service as the Defence Administrative Assistant in Dili, East Timor, the senior Naval Police Coxswain at HMAS Cerberus and Ship's Warrant Officer in HMAS Sydney.

Army
 Major Ann Elizabeth Sherren  – For meritorious service as a Regimental Sergeant Major at Adelaide Logistics Battalion, a Military Support Officer at Defence Community Organisation – Darwin, and Second-in-Command of 1st Combat Signal Regiment.
 Warrant Officer Class One David John Allen  – For meritorious service as the Regimental Sergeant Major of 7th Battalion, Royal Australian Regiment; Regimental Sergeant Major, Mentoring and Reconstruction Task Force One; and Regimental Sergeant Major, Combat Training Centre.
 Warrant Officer Class One Steven John Di Tullio  – For meritorious service as Regimental Sergeant Major of the 6th Engineer Support Regiment, the 2nd Combat Engineer Regiment and the School of Military Engineering.
 Warrant Officer Class One Christopher Walton Mayfield  – For meritorious service as Master Gunner Proof and Experimental Establishment Graytown and as the Regimental Sergeant Major 8th/12th Regiment, Royal Australian Artillery.
 Warrant Officer Class One Paul Marcus Richardson  – For meritorious service as Regimental Sergeant Major of the 1st Aviation Regiment, the 3rd Combat Service Support Battalion, Army School of Ordnance and the Royal Australian Army Ordnance Corps.

Air Force
 Group Captain Ian Andrew Nesbitt  – For meritorious service in the field of Air Combat Capability support.
 Wing Commander Stephen Gareth Chappell  – For meritorious service to the Royal Australian Air Force in the field of Air Combat.
 Wing Commander Stewart Mathew Seeney  – For meritorious service as the Aviation Safety Officer at Number 81 Wing and Staff Officer Airworthiness and Capability Management at Headquarters Air Combat Group.
 Flight Sergeant Matthew Mark Rush  – For meritorious service in the field of Communication Information Systems.

Public Service Medal (PSM)

Australian Public Service
 Graham AKROYD  – For outstanding public service in the defence field of weapon/missile computational and simulation development.
 Amanda Jane CATTERMOLE  – For outstanding public service in leading reform of the provision of housing for Indigenous people in remote communities and the National Gambling Reform Laws.
 Ian Ross DEANE  – For outstanding public service in providing legal advice and other assistance to the Department of Immigration and Citizenship.
 Helen Elaine FERGUSON  – For outstanding public service as a social worker for the Department of Human Services in rural and remote communities.
 His Excellency Paul FOLEY  – (Australian Ambassador to Iran) For outstanding public service to international relations as Australia's Ambassador to Afghanistan from 2010 to 2012. 
 Denise HODGSON  – For outstanding public service in the role of Multicultural Service Officer for the Department of Human Services within the Mid Coast NSW Zone.
 Doctor Doug Cromar KEAN  – For outstanding public service in contributing to the understanding of Australia's strategic interests and the international environment.
 Patricia Margaret KELLY  – For outstanding public service in leading the promotion and implementation of higher levels of innovation in the Australian Public Service and for her leadership of the Australian Government's bid to host the international Square Kilometre Array facility.
 Renée Elmina LEON  – For outstanding public service to public administration and law in leadership roles in the Australian Capital Territory and the Commonwealth. 
 Charles Andrew MASKELL-KNIGHT  – For outstanding public service to policy across many aspects of health and Commonwealth/State relations. 
 Rona Louise MELLOR  – For outstanding public service in the development and implementation of bio-security, taxation and health system policies and projects. 
 Lyn O'CONNELL  – For outstanding public service in the development of national transport reforms. 
 Nigel Richard RAY  – For outstanding public service through contributing to economic policy and the Australian Government's fiscal strategy in response to the Global Financial Crisis
 Timothy Emmanuel SPITERI  – For outstanding public service in support of Australia's diplomatic and military efforts in Afghanistan.
 Ann Margaret STEWARD  – For outstanding public service through the development of central coordinated Information and Communications Technology programs in government as the 
Australian Government Chief Information Officer and head of the Australian Government Information Management Office.

New South Wales Public Service
 Kenneth Henry CRAIG  – For outstanding public service, particularly as the Northern Regional Manager of the Aboriginal Housing Office in New South Wales. 
 George Wheatley GATES  – For outstanding public service, particularly in the area of water management in New South Wales.
 Scott Robert GRIFFITHS  – For outstanding public service, particularly as Regional Director, Western Region of Ageing, Disability and Home Care, and as Regional Executive Director, Department of Family and Community Services, in New South Wales.
 Margaret Anne HUNTER  – For outstanding public service, particularly to public education in New South Wales.
 Doctor Peter John KENNEDY  – For outstanding public service to the public health system in New South Wales, particularly as Deputy Chief Executive, Clinical Excellence Commission.
 Dawn Gloria KING  – For outstanding public service as an Executive Officer with New South Wales Police
 Phillip Leslie RASKALL  – For outstanding public service to the City of Sydney Council.
 Nicole Anne ROSE  – For outstanding public service, particularly as the Director of the Office of the NSW Police Commissioner.
 James Francis WHITE  – For outstanding public service to public education, particularly in the New England region of New South Wales.
 Kathryn Heather WILLIAMS  – For outstanding public service in providing improved housing outcomes for disadvantaged communities, particularly in the outer suburbs of Sydney.

Victorian Public Service
 Paul Vincent BRODERICK  – For outstanding public service to the Victorian community through his leadership and achievement of world class standards of efficiency and operation at the State Revenue Office.
 Antonietta CAVALLO  – For outstanding public service in developing and implementing the Graduated Licensing Scheme for novice and young drivers.
 Annemarie COUSINS  – For outstanding public service in the development and delivery of consumer protection policy and services to the benefit of the community, both in Victoria and nationally.
 Michael Peter EBDON  – For outstanding public service to the energy industry and to the community through the development of gas, pipeline and electricity safety in Victoria.
 John James GILLESPIE  – For outstanding public service to the finance and public transport portfolios through the delivery of policy and legislation services.
 Doctor John Adrian LYNCH  – For outstanding service to the justice system in Victoria.
 James William NELMS  – For outstanding public service to the Victorian Civil and Administrative Tribunal.
 John William SCHEFFER  – For outstanding public service to the development and delivery of forensic services, particularly in the biological field.
 Andrew Rex WALL  – For outstanding public service to Victoria's road network through the development of the SmartRoads program.
 Christopher WARDLAW  – For outstanding public service to education, particularly in leading major change programs in the education system in Victoria.

Queensland Public Service
 Janet BORN  – For outstanding public service to emergency services and community safety.
 Shirley Anne GLENNON  – For outstanding public service in leadership of Queensland's Healthy Hearing programs.
 Sharan Maree HARVEY  – For outstanding public service to the Brisbane City Council, particularly to the Brisbane City Council Library Service.
 Frances Margaret PAGE  – For outstanding public service to Indigenous health and support programs in north west Queensland.
 Kevin John POKARIER  – For outstanding public service, contributions and service excellence to internal and external clients of the Department of Natural Resources and Mines.

Western Australian Public Service
 Catherine Ann STODDART  – For outstanding public service, particularly as the Chief Nurse and Midwifery Officer of Western Australia.
 Raymond Stewart TAME  – For outstanding public service to the City of Armadale and to the Western Australian Local Government Association.

South Australian Public Service
 Doctor David Joseph CAUDREY  – For outstanding public service to the disability sector.
 Professor Dorothy Mary KEEFE  – For outstanding public service in the areas of public health, medical research and oncology.
 Gregory John PARKER  – For outstanding public service in the provision of legal and industrial advice.

Australian Police Medal (APM)

Australian Federal Police
 Commander Raymond Charles JOHNSON 
 Detective Superintendent Brett James McCANN

New South Wales Police
 Chief Superintendent Anthony TRICHTER 
 Superintendent Mark Alan HIRON 
 Superintendent David Gregory SIMMONS 
 Superintendent Mark Steven WALTON 
 Detective Superintendent Scott Joseph WHYTE 
 Detective Chief Inspector Daniel John SHARKEY 
 Detective Senior Sergeant Roslyn Ann KEYS 
 Senior Constable Imants RAMMA

Victoria Police
 Assistant Commissioner Jeffrey Stephen POPE 
 Superintendent Andrew Paul ALLEN 
 Superintendent Graeme Dean ARTHUR 
 Superintendent Philip Richard GREEN 
 Sergeant John Philip HARPER 
 Leading Senior Constable Ali GURDAG 
 Leading Senior Constable Brett Dale TANIAN

Queensland Police
 Superintendent Robert William WAUGH 
 Inspector Rolf Richard STRAATEMEIER 
 Inspector Deborah Thyra NICHOLSON 
 Senior Sergeant Kenneth Renald RACH 
 Senior Sergeant Megan Jane McARTHUR

Western Australian Police
 Superintendent Darryl Wesley GAUNT 
 Superintendent Kim Douglas PORTER 
 Superintendent Pryce Joseph SCANLAN 
 Sergeant Susan Merryn BOJCUN

South Australian Police
 Assistant Commissioner Paul McKinlay DICKSON 
 Senior Sergeant First Class Thomas Hendrikus NYENHUIS 
 Detective Senior Sergeant Wayne John WILLIAMSON 
 Sergeant Susan Merryn BOJCUN

Tasmanian Police
 Inspector Richard Stuart SCOTT

Northern Territory Police
 Senior Sergeant Shaun Clifford GILL

Australian Fire Service Medal (AFSM)

New South Wales
 Cathryn Monica DORAHY 
 Christopher Thomas FAVELLE 
 Elizabeth Mary FERRIS 
 Ronald HEADON 
 Garry James KADWELL 
 Doctor Christopher LEWIS 
 Darrell William PAUL 
 Keith Stanley ROBINSON 
 Arthur James SHARP 
 Graham Stewart TAIT 
 Robert John TINKER

Victoria
 Kenneth Stewart BAXTER 
 Geoffrey Bruce CONWAY 
 Andrew Melville HOWLETT 
 Ewan WALLER

Queensland
 James Colin BESGROVE 
 Roger STUBBS

Western Australia
 Gary Wayne KENNEDY 
 Keith Stanley ROBINSON

South Australia
 Frederick William STENT 
 Robert Leslie ZIERSCH

Australian Capital Territory
 Stephen John GIBBS 
 Richard John WOODS

Northern Territory
 Stephen John GIBBS

Ambulance Service Medal (ASM)

Queensland
 Richard GALEANO 
 Nicholas Constantine LENTAKIS

South Australia
 Raymond Paul CREEN 
 Gregory Michael JOSEPH

Australian Capital Territory
 David Shane DUTTON

Emergency Services Medal (ESM)

New South Wales
 Patricia Dorothy FAYERS 
 James Lindsay GLISSAN 
 Leslie Eric MILNE 
 Joan NOBLE

Victoria
 Julie Mary JOCHS 
 Colin John MATHESON

Queensland
 Gregory Lawrence TURNER

Western Australia
 Joseph Anthony TAYLOR

South Australia
 Susan Dorothie GAGE 
 Trevor Ross HEITMANN

Australian Capital Territory
 John Bernard DOWLING

Medal for Gallantry (MG)

Army

 Sergeant C  – For acts of gallantry in action in hazardous circumstances as a team commander, Special Operations Task Group on Operation SLIPPER in Afghanistan.
 Sergeant Blaine Flower DIDDAMS  – (Deceased) For acts of gallantry in action in hazardous circumstances as a patrol commander, Special Operations Task Group Rotation XVII on Operation SLIPPER in Afghanistan on 2 July 2012.

Commendation for Gallantry

Army

 Corporal A  – For acts of gallantry in action as a deputy patrol commander, Special Operations Task Group, on Operation SLIPPER in Afghanistan.
 Private A  – For acts of gallantry in action as a team member, Special Operations Task Group on Operation SLIPPER in Afghanistan.
 Corporal B  – For acts of gallantry in action as a team commander, Special Operations Task Group on Operation SLIPPER in Afghanistan.
 Sapper R  – For acts of gallantry in action as a special operations engineer, Special Operations Task Group on Operation SLIPPER in Afghanistan.

Distinguished Service Cross (DSC)

Army

 Major General Stuart Lyle SMITH  – For distinguished command and leadership in warlike operations as Commander Joint Task Force 633 on Operation SLIPPER from January to October 2012.
 Lieutenant Colonel Kahlil Scarf FEGAN  – For distinguished command and leadership in warlike operations and in action as the Commanding Officer, Mentoring Task Force 4 on Operation SLIPPER in Afghanistan from January to June 2012.
 Lieutenant Colonel J   – For distinguished command and leadership in warlike operations and in action as the Commanding Officer, Special Operations Task Group on Operation SLIPPER in Afghanistan.

Bar to the Distinguished Service Medal (DSM & Bar)

Army

 Major M  – For distinguished leadership in warlike operations and in action as an officer commanding in the Special Operations Task Group on Operation SLIPPER in Afghanistan.

Distinguished Service Medal (DSM)

Army

 Major N  – For distinguished leadership in warlike operations and in action as an officer commanding in the Special Operations Task Group on Operation SLIPPER in Afghanistan.
 Captain M  – For distinguished leadership in warlike operations and in action as a platoon commander, Special Operations Task Group, on Operation SLIPPER in Afghanistan.
 Sergeant M  – For distinguished leadership in warlike operations and in action as a section commander with Special Operations Task Group on Operation SLIPPER in Afghanistan.

Commendation for Distinguished Service

Navy
 Commodore Jonathan Dallas MEAD  – For distinguished performance of duty in warlike operations as the Commander Combined Task Force 150 on Operation SLIPPER in the Middle East from October 2011 to April 2012. 
 Commander Richard John BOULTON  – For distinguished performance of duty in warlike operations as the Commanding Officer, HMAS Melbourne on Operation SLIPPER in the Middle East from February to July 2012.

Army

 Brigadier Simone Wilkie  – For distinguished performance of duty in warlike operations as Assistant Commander – Afghanistan, Joint Task Force 633 on Operation SLIPPER from September 2011 to August 2012.
 Captain D  – For distinguished performance of duty in warlike operations and in action as the Regimental Medical Officer, Special Operations Task Group, on Operation SLIPPER 
in Afghanistan.
 Sergeant T  – For distinguished performance of duty in warlike operations and in action as a patrol commander, Special Operations Task Group, on Operation SLIPPER in Afghanistan.
 Sergeant W  – For distinguished performance of duty in warlike operations and in action as the Explosive Ordnance Disposal Technician and Mobility Survivability Commander, Special Operations Task Group, on Operation SLIPPER in Afghanistan.

Air Force

 Wing Commander Catherine Mary WILLIAMS  – For distinguished performance of duty in warlike operations as Commanding Officer, Multi-National Base Tarin Kowt, on Operation SLIPPER in Afghanistan from November 2011 to July 2012.

Conspicuous Service Cross (CSC)

Navy

 Commander Rachel Ann DURBIN  – For outstanding devotion to duty as the Royal Australian Navy Category Manager for Technical Officers and Sailors in the Directorate of Navy Category Management.
 Commander David Edward GRAHAM  – For outstanding devotion to duty as the Executive Officer, HMAS Creswell
 Commander Michael John STOCK  – For meritorious service as the Defence Administrative Assistant in Dili, East Timor, the senior Naval Police Coxswain at HMAS Cerberus and Ship's Warrant Officer in HMAS Sydney.
 Lieutenant Commander Paul John HINES  – For outstanding achievement as the Commanding Officer, Patrol Boat Crew ARDENT FIVE in the rescue of 273 survivors in two search and rescue operations in June and July 2012.
 Lieutenant Commander Peter Matthew SMITH  – For outstanding achievement as the Officer-in-Charge of the Submarine and Underwater Medicine Unit in HMAS Penguin.

Army

 Brigadier David Anthony CREAGH  – For outstanding achievement as the Director General Logistics Assurance, Joint Logistics Command.
 Brigadier Iain Geoffrey SPENCE  – For outstanding achievement as the Director General Reserves – Army.
 Colonel Luke FOSTER  – For outstanding achievement as the inaugural Commander Joint Task Force 637 on Operation QUEENSLAND FLOOD ASSIST in January 2011 and as Commander Joint Task Force 631 on Operation ASTUTE in Timor Leste from June 2011 to October 2012.
 Colonel Duncan Leslie HAYWARD  – For outstanding achievement as the Director International Engagement – Army.
 Colonel Michael John LEHMANN  – For outstanding achievement and leadership as the Director Military Afghanistan, Defence Signals Directorate, providing intelligence support to Australian and Coalition forces in Afghanistan.
 Colonel Andrew Neil MacNAB  – For outstanding achievement as Commander, Joint Combined Task Force 630 in support of the Papua New Guinea Electoral Commission on Operation CATHEDRAL from May to July 2012.
 Lieutenant Colonel Scott Andrew CORRIGAN  – For outstanding achievement as the Commanding Officer of the Special Operations Engineer Regiment.
 Lieutenant Colonel Simon James HERITAGE  – For outstanding achievement as the Commander Australian Contingent on Operation ASLAN in the Republic of South Sudan from October 2011 to February 2012.
 Lieutenant Colonel Scott Alexander TATNELL  – For outstanding achievement as the Commanding Officer Combat Training CentreLive.
 Chaplain Catherine Margaret INCHES-OGDEN  – For outstanding achievement as a chaplain in the Australian Army, in the roles of unit chaplain, training and development officer, deployed chaplain and as the Senior Chaplain to Army Headquarters.
 Major Nerida Gaye BYRNES  – For outstanding devotion to duty as the Acting Commanding Officer, Joint Health Unit – North Queensland, Joint Health Command.
 Warrant Officer Class One Robert McKay FROST  – For outstanding achievement in the performance of duty as the Telecommunications Systems Engineer, Special Operations Headquarters.

Air Force

 Group Captain Glen Philip BECK  – For outstanding achievement as Commanding Officer of Number 77 Squadron.
 Flight Lieutenant Paul Anthony GORMLEY  – For outstanding achievement in the leadership, development and sustainment of the AP-3C Orion Operational Mission Simulator.
 Flight Lieutenant Trent McINTOSH  – For outstanding achievement as a Logistics Officer in Aerospace Systems Division, Defence Materiel Organisation.
 Leading Aircraftman Sandy Christopher MacLEOD  – For outstanding achievement in the delivery and operation of a space-based surveillance capability at Number 1 Radar Surveillance Unit.

Conspicuous Service Medal (CSM)

Navy

 Commander Anita Louise SELLICK  – For meritorious devotion to duty as Staff Officer Navigation and Seamanship and as Commander Policy, Australian Maritime Warfare Centre.
 Commander Jennifer Anne WITTWER  – For meritorious devotion to duty as the Royal Australian Navy Strategic Women's Adviser.
 Lieutenant Commander Alexander Richard GIBBS  – For meritorious achievement as Staff Officer Grade 2 Operations in Headquarters Northern Command in support of border protection operations.
 Lieutenant Clinton Ernest WALTERS  – For meritorious achievement in support of Operation RESOLUTE during 2011 and 2012 while serving as the Executive Officer, Patrol Boat Crew ATTACK FOUR.
 Chief Petty Officer Craig DALY  – For meritorious achievement as the Senior Technical Officer aboard HMAS Wewak
 Petty Officer Leigh Adrian KUBACKI  – For meritorious devotion to duty as the Naval Police Coxswain in patrol boat crew ASSAIL ONE.

Army

 Lieutenant Colonel Mark Andrew ZAMMIT  – For meritorious achievement as Commander, Air Operations Planning Team, in support of the Papua New Guinea Electoral Commission on Operation CATHEDRAL in Papua New Guinea from March to July 2012.
 Lieutenant Colonel B  – For meritorious achievement in command and staff appointments within Special Operations Command over an extended period of service.
 Major Mark Drake DUNN  – For meritorious devotion to duty as the Staff Officer Grade Two Senior Warrant Officer Management Section, Directorate of Soldier Career Management – Army.
 Major Ryan James HOLMES  – For meritorious achievement as the Staff Officer Grade Two Physical Employment Standards in Army Headquarters.
 Major Bronwyn Merle JOHNSTONE  – For meritorious achievement as the Acting Staff Officer Grade One Establishments in the Directorate of Plans – Army. 
 Major Jeremy Thomas MIKUS  – For meritorious achievement in the planning and execution of the Army TORCH Battlespace Management System trial within 1st Brigade.  
 Captain Alisa Jane WICKHAM  – For meritorious devotion to duty as the Assistant Employment Category Manager for Army Health Services. 
 Warrant Officer Class One Stephen Joseph FIELD  – For meritorious devotion to duty as the Contract Authority Representative at Cargo Helicopter Management Unit, Army Aviation Systems Branch in support of the Army Aviation CH-47D Chinook capability. 
 Warrant Officer Class Two G  – For meritorious achievement while appointed Senior Instructor Strategic Strike Cell at the Special Air Service Regiment. 
 Sergeant James Tunzi LONG  – For meritorious achievement as a Section Commander and Platoon Sergeant Rehabilitation Platoon, 1st Battalion, Royal Australian Regiment.

Air Force

 Wing Commander Lionel George BENTLEY  – For meritorious devotion to duty in support of Heron remotely piloted vehicle operations.
 Squadron Leader Michel-Louise DEVINE  – For meritorious devotion to duty as the Health Centre Manager, Edinburgh Health Centre, Joint Health Unit – South Australia, Joint Health Command.
 Warrant Officer Stephen Craig EDWARDS  – For meritorious achievement as the Warrant Officer Engineering at Number 4 Squadron. 
 Warrant Officer Damien Peter JACKSON  – For meritorious achievement as the Warrant Officer Engineering of Number 10 Squadron and as the Number 92 Wing Logistics Operations Warrant Officer.

References
2013 Queen's Birthday Honours Lists, Governor-General of Australia: The Australian Honours Secretariat

Orders, decorations, and medals of Australia
2013 awards in Australia